Éric Castonguay (born September 18, 1987) is a Canadian professional ice hockey player who is currently playing for HC Sierre-Anniviers in the Swiss League (SL), the second tier league of Switzerland.

Playing career
Castonguay's Midget AAA career included time with Collège Antoine-Girouard, followed by 3 seasons with the Lewiston Maineiacs of the Quebec Major Junior Hockey League for his Major Junior Ice Hockey career.

After completing his Midget AAA and Major Junior Ice Hockey careers, he began his professional Ice Hockey career starting with the 2007-08 season.  He has played professionally for the Trenton Devils and Reading Royals of the ECHL.  On June 2, 2011, the Reading Royals of the ECHL announced that they had included Castonguay on their protected list.  He has also played professionally for the Lowell Devils and Bridgeport Sound Tigers of the American Hockey League and Dragons de Rouen and Diables Rouges de Briançon, both of the French Ligue Magnus.

On September 21, 2013, Castonguay signed with the Missouri Mavericks of the Central Hockey League for the 2013–14 season.  During that season, in a game against the Quad City Mallards on March 23, 2014, Castonguay set a Mavericks single-season franchise record of 31 Goals, which itself would ultimately be broken later that same season by Andrew Courtney, who ended the season with 34 Goals.  That same season, in the Central Hockey League 2013-14 Season "Best of The Best" Poll, he came in 2nd place in the poll for Most Gentlemanly Player.  On April 18, 2014, Castonguay was loaned to the Chicago Wolves of the American Hockey League.

On May 17, 2014, Castonguay signed with Frisk Asker Ishockey of the Norwegian GET-ligaen. In 2017, Castonguay signed a contract with AIK IF in HockeyAllsvenskan. After having a productive season where he ranked third in the league for scoring, Castonguay signed an extension with the team.

References

External links

1987 births
Living people
AIK IF players
Bridgeport Sound Tigers players
Canadian expatriate ice hockey players in France
Canadian expatriate ice hockey players in Norway
Canadian ice hockey right wingers
Chicago Wolves players
Diables Rouges de Briançon players
Dragons de Rouen players
French Quebecers
Frisk Asker Ishockey players
Leksands IF players
Lewiston Maineiacs players
Lowell Devils players
Missouri Mavericks players
People from Granby, Quebec
Reading Royals players
Tingsryds AIF players
Trenton Devils players